The Springs Fire was a wildfire in Ventura County, California in May 2013. Although the fire burned only 15 homes, it threatened 4,000. This threat passed when rain shower moved through the California area because of a low-pressure system off the coast. Some places got more than half an inch of rain.

The fire started at 6:45 AM on May 2, 2013, in Camarillo, California near U.S. Route 101 and burned across Pacific Coast Highway to the Pacific Ocean. Several neighborhoods were evacuated, along with the campus of California State University Channel Islands.

Impacts
Weather conditions made favorable conditions for brush fires. By May 3, the fire was only 20 percent contained; on May 4, higher humidity made firefighters jobs easier; and on May 5 the fire was 60 percent contained. On May 6, 2013, the fire was almost extinguished as rain fell in the area.

Scientists are concerned about the impact of the fire on Dudleya verityi, a rare species of succulent plant known by the common name Verity's liveforever.  Endemic to Ventura County, this species is only found on one edge of the Santa Monica Mountains, where it occurs in coastal sage scrub habitat. The dominant plants are California sagebrush (Artemisia californica), California buckwheat (Eriogonum fasciculatum) and purple sage (Salvia leucophylla). At least two occurrences are within the campus bounds of California State University, Channel Islands where faculty and students are tracking sites where the plant exists and studying it.

See also

2013 California wildfires

References

2013 California wildfires
Wildfires in Ventura County, California